William Hamilton McKinlay (24 March 1882 – 19 April 1952) was an Australian rules footballer who played with Geelong in the Victorian Football League (VFL).

References

External links 
		

1882 births
1952 deaths
Australian rules footballers from Victoria (Australia)
Geelong Football Club players
Geelong West Football Club players